George Macaulay Booth (22 September 1877 - 10 March 1971) was a British businessman, and a director of the Bank of England.

George Macaulay Booth was born on 22 September 1877 in London, the son of the social reformer Charles Booth and his wife Mary Catherine Macaulay.

From 1936 to 1937, he was High Sheriff of the County of London, and living at 28 Chester Street, Belgravia. He declined Lloyd George's offer of a barony.

On 6 October 1906, he married Margaret Meinertzhagen (1880-1959), daughter of Daniel Meinertzhagen VI and Georgina Potter. Her brother was the naturalist Richard Meinertzhagen (1878-1967).

References

1877 births
1971 deaths
High Sheriffs of the County of London
English businesspeople
People associated with the Bank of England